Altstätten SG railway station is a railway station in Altstätten, in the Swiss canton of St. Gallen. It is an intermediate stop on the Chur–Rorschach line and is served by local and long-distance trains. The station is located east of the town center; another station, Altstätten Stadt, is located in the town center and is the eastern terminus of the  Altstätten–Gais line with additional local services.

Services 
The following services call at Altstätten SG:

 St. Gallen S-Bahn:
 : hourly service to Nesslau-Neu St. Johann
 : hourly service via Sargans (circular operation).

References

External links 
 
 

Railway stations in the canton of St. Gallen
Swiss Federal Railways stations
Altstätten